Violet Hill is an unincorporated community and census-designated place (CDP) in Izard County, Arkansas, United States. Violet Hill has a post office with ZIP code 72584. It was first listed as a CDP in the 2020 census with a population of 36.

It is a part of the Izard County Consolidated School District. It was served by the Violet Hill School District until it consolidated into Izard County consolidated on July 1, 1985.

Demographics

2020 census

Note: the US Census treats Hispanic/Latino as an ethnic category. This table excludes Latinos from the racial categories and assigns them to a separate category. Hispanics/Latinos can be of any race.

References

Unincorporated communities in Izard County, Arkansas
Unincorporated communities in Arkansas
Census-designated places in Izard County, Arkansas
Census-designated places in Arkansas